Nana Owiredu Lartey Sarpong (born 16 September 1996) is an English-Ghanaian footballer who plays for Southern League South Division club Walton Casuals as a midfielder.

He has also played for Notts County, Boston United, Billericay Town and Grays Athletic.

Club career

Early career 
Sarpong began his career as a youth team player at Bromley, and represented the Kent County Football Association team at Under-16 level.

Notts County 
In November 2013, Sarpong joined Notts County after being spotted by local scouts. He signed a professional contract in April 2015.

On 23 April 2016, he made his professional debut as a substitute for Graham Burke in a 2–1 League Two defeat against Cambridge United. Sarpong was released by the club in May 2016.

Boston United (loan) 
In September 2015, Sarpong moved to National League North club Boston United on a three-month loan.

He made his debut as a substitute in a 2–1 defeat to Chorley, but was ruled out for over a month in his second appearance for the club. His final appearance came in a 2–1 win over Alfreton Town before a return to his parent club.

Billericay Town 
Upon his release, Sarpong joined Isthmian Premier Division club Billericay Town's Under-21 squad.

On 24 August 2016, he made a single appearance for the first-team in a 1–0 defeat to Lowestoft Town. Sarpong was named as an unused substitute in the club's FA Cup campaign.

Grays Athletic 
In December 2016, Sarpong joined Isthmian Premier Division rivals Grays Athletic. On 27 December, he made his debut in a 2–0 defeat to Dulwich Hamlet on 27 December. Sarpong scored his first senior goal in a 2–1 defeat to Hendon on 4 February 2017. He left the club at the end of the season.

Walton Casuals 
After trials with Staines Town and Walton Casuals, Sarpong joined the latter in August 2017. He made his debut in a 2–1 win at Hythe Town on Saturday 12 August, and scored his first goal for the club three days later in a 4–0 victory over Chipstead. On 26 September, Sarpong scored twice in a 3–3 draw at Greenwich Borough and added another brace two weeks later in a 3–0 win against Canvey Island. On 5 December, he scored twice in a 3–0 victory against Sittingbourne.

After starting in the Isthmian League South Division Play-Off Semi-Final, Sarpong came off the bench in the Play-Off Final at Corinthian-Casuals. He scored his team's fourth and final penalty to secure promotion to step three of the non-league pyramid.

Statistics

Honours 
Walton Casuals

 Isthmian League South Division Play-Off Champions: 2017–18

References

External links

1995 births
Living people
English footballers
Ghanaian footballers
Association football midfielders
English Football League players
National League (English football) players
Isthmian League players
Bromley F.C. players
Notts County F.C. players
Boston United F.C. players
Billericay Town F.C. players
Grays Athletic F.C. players
Walton Casuals F.C. players